Laura Mako (May 29, 1916 – May 5, 2019) was an American interior designer and decorator known for decorating the homes of many Hollywood stars. She was considered "one of the best decorators in the field" and worked with clients such as Bob Hope, Henry Mancini and Dean Martin. She designed the interiors of Betty and Gerald Ford's post-Presidency home in Rancho Mirage, California with a style the New York Times called "Palm Springs via Palm Beach," and Town & Country called "desert modern aesthetic...and, most importantly, happy."

When Mako was a young woman she was considered a protegee of Helen Hayes and was given away by Hayes' husband Charles MacArthur at her wedding. She was a godmother to Lorenzo Lamas. Mako designed home interiors and also Hollywood institutions such as the Jessica Nail Clinic and events such as the wedding of Princes Scheherazade.

Personal life
Mako was born Laura Mae Church and married Gene Mako in November 1941. Her family was from Saint Mary's County, Maryland and she returned part-time to Maryland after spending most of her time in California. She attended Georgetown Visitation Preparatory School and graduated from New York School of Interior Design.

References

1916 births
2019 deaths
American designers
American women interior designers
21st-century American women